Christine Baranski is an actress of the stage and screen.

She has received many awards and nominations for her work including one Emmy Award, three Screen Actors Guild Awards, a Critics' Choice Movie Award, two Tony Awards, and two Drama Desk Awards.

For her work on television she has received fifteen Primetime Emmy Award nominations for her performances in Cybill, Frasier, The Big Bang Theory, and The Good Wife. She also received three Golden Globe Award nominations. She received eight Screen Actor Guild Award nominations for her work in both film and television winning for Cybil in 1995, The Birdcage (1996), and Chicago (2002). For her work on the Broadway stage she received two Tony Award nominations and wins for her performances in The Real Thing in 1984 and Rumours in 1989.

Major associations

Emmy Awards

Golden Globe Awards

Screen Actors Guild Awards

Tony Awards

Miscellaneous awards

AARP Movies for Grownups Awards

American Comedy Awards

Blockbuster Entertainment Awards

Critics' Choice Awards

New York Women in Film & Television Awards

Online Film & Television Association

Phoenix Film Critics Society Awards

Television Critics Association Awards

Viewers for Quality Television Awards

Theater awards

Drama Desk Awards

Notes

References

External links

Baranski, Christine